Mount St. Bride is a prominent  mountain summit located in Banff National Park, in the Rocky Mountains of Alberta. It is the highest point in the Sawback Range. Its nearest higher peak is Cataract Peak,  to the northwest.


History

Mount St. Bride was named in 1898 for Saint Bride, the patron saint of the Douglas family.

The first ascent of the mountain was made in 1910 by J. W. A. Hickson with guides Edward Feuz Sr. and Edward Feuz Jr.

The mountain's name was officially adopted in 1956 when approved by the Geographical Names Board of Canada.

Geology

Like other mountains in Banff Park, Mount St. Bride is composed of sedimentary rock laid down during the Precambrian to Jurassic periods. Formed in shallow seas, this sedimentary rock was pushed east and over the top of younger rock during the Laramide orogeny.

Climate

Based on the Köppen climate classification, Mount St. Bride is located in a subarctic climate zone with cold, snowy winters, and mild summers. Winter temperatures can drop below −20 °C with wind chill factors below −30 °C.

See also
Geography of Alberta
Geology of Alberta

References

External links
 Weather forecast: Mount St. Bride
 Parks Canada web site: Banff National Park

Three-thousanders of Alberta
Mountains of Banff National Park
Alberta's Rockies